Napoleon is an unincorporated community and census-designated place (CDP) in Jackson County in the U.S. state of Michigan. The population of the CDP was 1,258 at the 2010 census.  It is located within Napoleon Township.

Geography

Napoleon is in southeastern Jackson County, in the eastern part of Napoleon Township. State highway M-50 passes through the center of town, leading northwest  to Jackson, the county seat, and south  to Brooklyn.

Demographics

As of the census of 2000, there were 1,254 people, 473 households, and 340 families residing in the CDP. The racial makeup of the CDP was 96.89% White, 0.24% Black or African American, 0.24% Native American, 0.08% Asian, 1.12% from other races, and 1.44% from two or more races. Hispanic or Latino of any race were 2.15% of the population.

There were 473 households, out of which 37.2% had children under the age of 18 living with them, 50.3% were married couples living together, 13.5% had a female householder with no husband present, and 28.1% were non-families. 24.3% of all households were made up of individuals, and 8.5% had someone living alone who was 65 years of age or older.  The average household size was 2.65 and the average family size was 3.05.

In the CDP, the population was spread out, with 30.6% under the age of 18, 6.3% from 18 to 24, 30.6% from 25 to 44, 22.1% from 45 to 64, and 10.4% who were 65 years of age or older.  The median age was 34 years. For every 100 females, there were 100.6 males.  For every 100 females age 18 and over, there were 92.1 males.

The median income for a household in the CDP was $39,737, and the median income for a family was $41,464. Males had a median income of $31,842 versus $23,705 for females. The per capita income for the CDP was $14,932.  About 8.5% of families and 9.3% of the population were below the poverty line, including 11.9% of those under age 18 and 9.9% of those age 65 or over.

Education
The school system in Napoleon is managed by the Napoleon Community Schools. This includes Napoleon High School and Napoleon Middle School, and Ezra Eby Elementary.

Highways

References

External links
 Napoleon Community Schools

Unincorporated communities in Jackson County, Michigan
Census-designated places in Michigan
Unincorporated communities in Michigan
Census-designated places in Jackson County, Michigan